Eucalyptus goniocarpa is a species of mallet that is endemic to southern Western Australia. It has smooth bark, glossy bluish adult leaves, flower buds in groups of three, creamy-white flowers, and ribbed, conical to barrel-shaped fruit.

Description
It has smooth, grey to brown bark.

Taxonomy and naming
Eucalyptus goniocarpa was first formally described in 1992 by Ken Hill and Lawrie Johnson from a collection made in 1986 by the authors with Donald Blaxell near Lake King. The description was published in the journal Telopea. The specific epithet is derived from the Greek words gonia meaning 'an angle', and karpos, 'a fruit', referring to the strongly winged fruit.

Distribution and habitat
This eucalypt is mostly restricted to the area around Lake King where it often grows in thickets.

Conservation status
Eucalyptus goniocarpa is classified as "not threatened" by the Western Australian Government Department of Parks and Wildlife.

See also
List of Eucalyptus species

References

Eucalypts of Western Australia
goniocarpa
Myrtales of Australia
Plants described in 1992